Dejan Stamenković (born 8 August 1990) is a Serbian football midfielder.

References

External links
 

1990 births
Living people
Sportspeople from Niš
Association football defenders
Serbian footballers
FK Sinđelić Niš players
FK Srem players
Serbian expatriate footballers
Serbian expatriate sportspeople in Albania
Expatriate footballers in Albania